Osolnica is an abandoned village in the municipality of Centar Župa, North Macedonia.

Demographics
The village, when previously inhabited, was traditionally populated by a Turkish speaking community consisting of Turks.

According to the 2002 census, the village had a total of 0 inhabitants.

References

Villages in Centar Župa Municipality
Turkish communities in North Macedonia